The Journal of Criminal Law & Criminology ("JCLC") is a peer-reviewed, student-run academic journal published by the Northwestern University School of Law. Student editors select and edit articles submitted by professors, scholars, judges, practitioners, and students. The Journal publishes four issues per year, and hosts an annual Symposium focused on a select topic of criminal law.

History
The journal was established in 1910 as the Journal of the American Institute of Criminal Law and Criminology by Dean John Henry Wigmore. From 1931 to 1951 it was named Journal of Criminal Law and Criminology and from 1951 to 1972 The Journal of Criminal Law, Criminology, and Police Science. It received its current name in 1973.

The Journal was an outgrowth of the "National Conference on Criminal Law and Criminology," hosted at Northwestern University School of Law in 1909 in celebration of the law school's fiftieth anniversary. Consistent with the progressive agenda in the early twentieth century, the purpose of the Journal was to articulate and promote criminal justice reform.

JCLC has a unique interdisciplinary approach, and remains today the only journal in the world that combines both criminal law and criminology. This contributes to the success and reach of the Journal: JCLC is one of the most widely-read and frequently-cited publications in the world. Today, it is the second most-widely subscribed-to journal published by any law school in the United States.

Notable alumni
 Steven Drizin, lawyer and law professor at the Northwestern University Pritzker School of Law, Editor-in-Chief 1967-68

References

External links 

 

Quarterly journals
Northwestern University Pritzker School of Law
Publications established in 1910
American law journals
Criminology journals
English-language journals
1910 establishments in Illinois
Criminal law journals